Jean-Pierre Maurice Georges Beltoise (26 April 1937 – 5 January 2015) was a French Grand Prix motorcycle road racer and Formula One driver who raced for the Matra and BRM teams. He competed in 88 Grands Prix achieving a single victory, at the 1972 Monaco Grand Prix, and a total of eight podium finishes.

Early career
Beltoise won 11 French national motorcycle road racing titles in three years. He competed in international Grand Prix motorcycle racing from the 1962 to 1964 seasons in the 50, 125, 250 and 500 cc classes. His best finish was a sixth place in the 1964 50 cc World Championship.

In 1964 he was racing a 1.1-litre René Bonnet sports car. His career almost ended with a huge crash in the Reims 12-hour sports car endurance race, in which he suffered a broken arm, so severely damaged that its movement was permanently restricted. However he returned in 1965 and won the Reims Formula 3 race, after which he graduated to Formula 2 for the following season.

Formula One

In 1966, Beltoise drove in the German Grand Prix at the Nürburgring in a Formula Two (F2) one litre Matra MS5-Cosworth. He finished one lap down but won the F2 class. However, it was his only Grand Prix that season.
In 1967 Beltoise competed in three Grands Prix with a Formula Two Matra MS7 1.6 litre Cosworth, and finished seventh at both Watkins Glen and Mexico City. He also won the 1967 Buenos Aires Grand Prix, which was not part of the World Championship calendar. In 1968 Beltoise began the season again with an F2 car but from the second race onward had Formula One machinery and finished second in the 1968 Dutch Grand Prix. In 1969 he was placed in Ken Tyrrell's Matra team, whilst the works V12 engine was developed driving alongside Jackie Stewart, and finished second in the French grand Prix. Beltoise returned to the works Matra team for both 1970 and 1971. In 1971, racing in the Matra sports car team, he was involved in the accident in which Ignazio Giunti died during the 1000 km Buenos Aires, and his international racing license was suspended for some time.

In 1971 Matra signed Chris Amon as team leader which frustrated Beltoise's ambitions. For 1972 he moved to the BRM team and won what turned out to be his only and BRM's final championship-qualifying Formula One victory at the 1972 Monaco Grand Prix in heavy rain. He spent three seasons with BRM, without much success and finally retired from Formula 1 at the end of the 1974 season.

Later career
He later did most of the testing for the Ligier F1 team, although a proposed Formula One drive for 1976 went instead to Jacques Laffite and he thereafter turned his attention to touring car racing in France, twice winning the French title for BMW before entering rallycross in an Alpine-Renault with which he won the French title. In 1981 he returned to touring cars and raced for Peugeot throughout the 1980s. He was also a regular ice racer.  His two sons, Anthony and Julien, are both race drivers.

In fiction, Beltoise frequently appeared in the Michel Vaillant series of comic books, amongst others being part of the winning Vaillante Le Mans team.

Death 

Beltoise died at his holiday home in Dakar, Senegal, on 5 January 2015, aged 77, following two strokes.

Racing record

Motorcycle Grand Prix results

(key) (Races in italics indicate fastest lap)

24 Hours of Le Mans results

Complete European Formula Two Championship results
(key) (Races in bold indicate pole position; races in italics indicate fastest lap)

 Graded drivers not eligible for  European Formula Two Championship points

Complete Formula One World Championship results
(key) (races in italics indicate fastest lap)

Notes
 – In the 1969 German Grand Prix, Beltoise was classified 12th on the circuit but was the 6th Formula One car behind six Formula 2 cars, thus scoring one World Championship point.

Non-Championship Formula One results
(key) (Races in bold indicate pole position; results in italics indicate fastest lap)

References

French racing drivers
French Formula One drivers
Matra Formula One drivers
BRM Formula One drivers
Formula One race winners
European Formula Two Championship drivers
French Formula Three Championship drivers
French motorcycle racers
50cc World Championship riders
125cc World Championship riders
250cc World Championship riders
24 Hours of Le Mans drivers
12 Hours of Reims drivers
24 Hours of Daytona drivers
Trans-Am Series drivers
World Sportscar Championship drivers
Racing drivers from Paris
1937 births
2015 deaths